The following is a list of Oricon number-one singles of 1993

Oricon Weekly Singles Chart

References 

1993 record charts
1993 in Japanese music